The 1932 Dunbartonshire by-election was held on 17 March 1932.  The by-election was held due to the resignation of the incumbent Conservative MP, John Thom.  It was won by the Conservative candidate Archibald Cochrane.

References

Dunbartonshire by-election
Dunbartonshire by-election 1932
Politics of the Dunbartonshire
Dunbartonshire by-election
Dunbartonshire by-election
By-elections to the Parliament of the United Kingdom in Scottish constituencies